Salamatou Sow (born 1963) is a sociolinguist and anthropologist. She is from Niger and works on the Fulfulde language.

References

Living people
Place of birth missing (living people)
Sociolinguists
Women anthropologists
1963 births
People from Niamey